Bruss may refer to:

Brös an alternate spelling of a preparation of cheese and grappa
Franz Thomas Bruss, a Belgian-German professor of mathematics at the Université Libre de Bruxelles
Logan Bruss (born 1999), American football player
Robert Bruss, a real estate attorney and syndicated columnist known as "the Dear Abby of real estate"
Arthur Atkinson aka Arthur "Artie" 'Bruss' Atkinson, an English former professional rugby league footballer

Surnames from given names